Quercus myrsinifolia is an Asian species of tree in the beech family Fagaceae. It has several common names, including bamboo-leaf oak, Chinese evergreen oak, and Chinese ring-cupped oak. It is native to east central and southeast China, Japan, Korea, Laos, northern Thailand, and Vietnam. It is placed in subgenus Cerris, section Cyclobalanopsis.

Description

Leaves are  60–110 × 18–40 mm with serrulate margins;  the petiole is 10–25 mm long.
The acorns are ovoid to ellipsoid, 14–25 × 10–15 mm, and glabrous with a rounded apex; the flat scar is approx. 6 mm in diameter.  Cupules are 5–8 × 10–18 mm, enclosing 1/3–1/2 of acorn, bracts are not connate at the apex.

Gallery

References

External links
 
 

myrsinifolia
Trees of China
Trees of Japan
Trees of Korea
Trees of Taiwan
Flora of Indo-China
Plants described in 1850